was the twenty-fifth of the fifty-three stations of the Tōkaidō. It is located in what is now part of the city of Kakegawa, Shizuoka Prefecture, Japan.

History

Originally, various characters were used for Nissaka, including 入坂, 西坂 and 新坂, as it had been nothing more than a small town located between Kanaya-juku on the banks of the Ōi River and Kakegawa-juku, a castle town that was an intersection along an old salt trading route. When Nissaka-shuku was established as part of the Tōkaidō at the start of the Edo period, the characters for its name officially became 日坂.

The classic ukiyo-e print by Andō Hiroshige (Hōeidō edition) from 1831–1834 depicts travellers on a steep road in forbidding dark mountains contemplating a large boulder in the road. The stone was a noted landmark on Tōkaidō  called the "Night weeping stone". According to legend, the bandits attacked and murdered a pregnant woman on this spot. After she died, a passing priest heard the stone call out for him to rescue the surviving infant.

The Tōkaidō Main Line railroad, established during the Meiji period, was built to avoid the difficult pass and, as a result, the fortunes of Nissaka-shuku began to fall. It began to prosper again when Route 1 was rebuilt after World War II, with the new route running through Nissaka.

In 1955, the village of Nissaka in Ogasa District merged with the neighboring city of Kakegawa.

Ekiden
The city of Kakegawa hosts the  every year in April.

Neighboring post towns
Tōkaidō
Kanaya-juku - Nissaka-shuku - Kakegawa-juku

Further reading
Carey, Patrick. Rediscovering the Old Tokaido:In the Footsteps of Hiroshige. Global Books UK (2000). 
Chiba, Reiko. Hiroshige's Tokaido in Prints and Poetry. Tuttle. (1982) 
Taganau, Jilly. The Tokaido Road: Travelling and Representation in Edo and Meiji Japan. RoutledgeCurzon (2004).

References

Stations of the Tōkaidō
Stations of the Tōkaidō in Shizuoka Prefecture